Bernd Alois Zimmermann (20 March 1918 – 10 August 1970) was a German composer. He is perhaps best known for his opera Die Soldaten, which is regarded as one of the most important German operas of the 20th century, after those of Berg. As a result of his individual style, it is hard to label his music as avant-garde, serial or postmodern. His music employs a wide range of methods including the twelve-tone row and musical quotation.

Life
Zimmermann was born in Bliesheim (now part of Erftstadt) near Cologne. He grew up in a rural Catholic community in western Germany. His father worked for the German Reichsbahn (Imperial Railway) and was also a farmer. In 1929, Zimmermann began attending a private Catholic school, where he had his first real encounter with music. After the National Socialists (or Nazis) closed all private schools, he switched to a public Catholic school in Cologne where, in 1937, he received his Abitur, the German equivalent of a high school diploma.

In the same year, he fulfilled his duty for the Reichsarbeitsdienst and spent the 1937/1938 winter semester studying pedagogy at the Hochschule für Lehrerausbildung (lit. University for Teacher Training) in Bonn.

He began studying Music Education, Musicology and Composition in the winter of 1938 at the University for Music in Cologne.  In 1940, he was drafted in the Wehrmacht (the German Army) but was released in 1942 due to a severe skin illness. After he returned to his studies, he didn't receive a degree until 1947 due to the ending of the war. However, he was already busy as a free-lance composer in 1946, predominantly for radio. From 1948 to 1950, he was a participant in the Kranichsteiner/Darmstädter Ferienkursen für Neue Musik (lit. Kranichstein/Darmstadt Vacation Course for New Music) where he studied under René Leibowitz and Wolfgang Fortner, among others.

In 1957, he received a scholarship to spend time at the German Academy Villa Massimo in Rome. He also assumed the position of Professor of Composition (from Frank Martin) as well as Film and Broadcast Music at the Cologne Music University. In the 60s, he received more attention and success as a composer (including a second scholarship to the Villa Massimo in 1963 and a fellowship in the Academy of Arts, Berlin), especially after his opera Die Soldaten (The Soldiers) finally premiered in 1965. The opera had previously not been performed due to the enormous number of people required and the musical difficulty—the Cologne Opera had considered it "unspielbar" (not performable). The composer's depressive tendencies led to an emotional crisis, compounded by a quickly deteriorating eye problem. On 10 August 1970, Zimmermann committed suicide at his home in Königsdorf near Cologne – just five days after completing the score of his last composition, Ich wandte mich und sah an alles Unrecht das geschah unter der Sonne.  At the time, he was preparing another opera, Medea, after Hans Henny Jahnn.

Music
In his own compositional growth, he took his place in the progression of new music, from which the German composers were mostly separated during the Nazi regime. He began writing works in the neoclassical style, continued with free atonality and twelve-tone music and eventually arrived at serialism (in 1956). His affection for jazz can sometimes be heard in some of his compositions (more so in his Violin Concerto or Trumpet Concerto).

In contrast to the so-called Darmstadt School (Stockhausen, Boulez, Nono, etc.), Zimmermann did not make a radical break with tradition.  At the end of the 1950s, he developed his own personal compositional style, the pluralistic "Klangkomposition" (German word referring to the compositional style that focuses on planes – or areas – of sound and tone-colors). The combination and overlapping of layers of musical material from various time periods (from Medieval to Baroque and Classical to Jazz and Pop music) using advanced musical techniques is characteristic of Klangkomposition.  Zimmermann's use of this technique ranged from the embedding of individual musical quotes (seen somewhat in his orchestral work Photoptosis) to pieces that are built entirely as a collage (the ballet Musique pour les soupers du Roi Ubu). In his vocal works, especially his Requiem for a Young Poet, the text is used to progress the piece by overlapping texts from various sources.  He created his own musical stance using the metaphor "the spherical form of time".

Works
 Extemporale for piano (1946)
 Capriccio for Piano
 Lob der Torheit (burlesque cantata by Goethe), for solo, choir and large orchestra (1947)
 Enchiridion I for piano (1949)
 Märchensuite for orchestra (1950)
 Alagoana (Caprichos Brasileiros) Ballet Suite (1950)
 Rheinische Kirmestänze (1950, rearranged in 1962 for 13 wind instruments)
 Concert for Violin and orchestra (1950)
 Sonata for solo violin (1951)
 Symphony in one movement (1951, revised 1953)
 Enchiridion II for piano (1951)
 Concerto for oboe and chamber orchestra (1952)
 Des Menschen Unterhaltsprozeß gegen Gott (lit. The People's Maintenance Suit Against  God) Radio opera in three acts with text from Pedro Calderón de la Barca and adapted by Matthias Bungart.
 Nobody knows the trouble I see Concert for trumpet and chamber orchestra (1954)
 Sonata for Viola solo (1955)
 Konfigurationen (Configurations) for piano (1956)
 Perspektiven — Musik für ein imaginäres Ballet (Perspectives — Music for an imaginary ballet.) for 2 pianos (1956)
 "Die fromme Helene" after Wilhelm Busch sounded as a "Rondo popolare" for narrator and *instrumental ensemble (1957)
 Canto di speranza Cantata for cello and small orchestra (1957)
 Omnia tempus habent Cantata for soprano and 17 instruments (1957)
 Impromptu for orchestra (1958)
 Dialoge Concerto for two pianos and orchestra (1960)
 Re-written with the title Monologue for two pianos (1964)
 Sonata for solo cello (1960)
 Présence, ballet blanc for piano trio and narrator (with words from Paul Pörtner) (1961)
 Antiphonen for viola and 25 instrumentalists (1961)
 Tempus Loquendi for solo flute (1963)
 Musique pour les soupers du Roi Ubu (Ballet noir en sept parties et une entrée) Ballet after "Ubu Roi" by Alfred Jarry (1966)
 Die Soldaten Opera in four acts, libretto by the composer after the drama of the same name by Jakob Michael Reinhold Lenz (1965)
 Concerto for Cello and Orchestra en forme de pas de trois (1966), dedicated to Siegfried Palm
 Tratto Electronic composition (1967)
 Intercomunicazione for cello and piano (1967)
 Die Befristeten for jazz quintet (1967)
 Photoptosis Prelude for large orchestra (1968)
 Requiem für einen jungen Dichter — Lingual for narrator, soprano, baritone, three choirs, electric tape, orchestra, jazz combo and organ (1969)
 Vier kurze Studien for solo cello (1970)
 Stille und Umkehr orchestra sketches (1970)
 Tratto 2 Electronic composition (1970)
 Ich wandte mich um und sah alles Unrecht das geschah unter der Sonne — Ekklesiastische Aktion for two narrators, bass and orchestra (1970)
 Plus various compositions for radio, theater and film

Notes
A portion of this article was translated from the corresponding article in the German Wikipedia.

Citations
 Much of the content of this article comes from the equivalent German-language Wikipedia article (retrieved 28 May 2006).
 'Bernd Alois Zimmermann, Germany (1918–1970) UbuWeb (Accessed 28 May 2006)
 McCredie, Andrew D. (with Marion Rothärmel): 'Zimmermann, Bernd Alois', Grove Music Online ed. L. Macy (Accessed [28 May 2006]), Grove Music

External links

General purpose
 
 Music for the (Un)faint of Heart: Bernd Alois Zimmermann at 100 by Michael Schell, Second Inversion
  
 Homepage of the Bernd-Alois-Zimmermann-Society (BAZG) 
 „Stille und Umkehr“ - Betrachtungen zum Phänomen Zeit von Michael Denhoff 
 Anmerkungen zu Bernd Alois Zimmermann by Jörn Peter Hiekel 
 Bernd Alois Zimmermann bibliography by Ralph Paland

Listening
 
 Listen to "Preludio" from Zimmermann's Die Soldaten at Acousmata music blog

1918 births
1970 suicides
People from Erftstadt
German Roman Catholics
20th-century classical composers
German opera composers
Male opera composers
People from the Rhine Province
Suicides in Germany
Hochschule für Musik und Tanz Köln alumni
German male classical composers
20th-century German composers
20th-century German male musicians
Reich Labour Service members
German Army personnel of World War II